Amani may refer to:
 Amani, Hormozgan (عماني - ‘Amānī)